Wintter Haynes Watts (Cincinnati, Ohio, March 14, 1884 – Brooklyn, New York, November 1, 1962) was an American composer of art songs.

Life and musical career
Watts was born in Cincinnati, Ohio, and his early studies were in painting, architecture, voice, and organ.  He later studied at The Academy of Musical Art in New York City and in Florence, Italy.  He won the Morris Loeb Prize in 1919 for his symphony Young Blood and the Prix de Rome in 1923.  He returned to Italy a few years later and stayed until 1931, when he returned to the United States.  After 1931 he fell into obscurity.

Musical works
Watts composed around 70 songs for voice and piano in the years between 1906 and 1924.  Most were published individually by Oliver Ditson or G. Schirmer.  The songs were highly esteemed in their day, and Upton praised them for their distinctly 'American' sound.  His most important song cycle is his Vignettes of Italy, nine songs from 1919, settings of poems by Sara Teasdale reflecting on various Italian locations and their associated emotional recollections.  Many important singers performed his songs in concert, most notably
Kirsten Flagstad and John McCormack, to whom Watts dedicated several songs.  None of his other music was ever published.

Published songs
Three Songs, John Church Co., 1906
Love’s Life (R. B. Butler)
A Drop o’ Dew (H. Canfield)
The Joy of Man (Wanting) (unknown author)

Three Songs, John Church Co., 1906
Clover (W. Bynner)
Admonition—Roses and Thorns (R. W. Gilder)
The Song of the Wind (N. E. Barnhart)

The Joy of Man, Op. 2, no. 1 (Marshall Pancoast), John Church Co., 1908
Four Songs, Op. 3. G. Schirmer, 1908
A Hope (W. Watts)
My World (Richard Watson Gilder)
The Stairway (Richard Watson Gilder)
The Difficulty (after Heine)

Two Poems by A. Symons, Op. 4. G. Schirmer, 1908
Dreams (Arthur Symons)
During Music (Arthur Symons)

Another Day, (unknown author), John Church Co., 1909
Dinna Ask Me (Dunlop), G. Schirmer, 1909
Locations (Tom Hall), John Church Co., 1909
The Ocean Tramp (L. Hope), G. Schirmer, 1909
Five Songs, G. Schirmer, 1910
Alone (words from the Spanish)
Home (D. Greenwell)
It isn’t the Thing You Do, Dear (unknown author)
Oh, Call it by some Better Name (Thomas Moore)
Surf Song (L. Hope)

Blue are Her Eyes (Mary MacMillan), Oliver Ditson, 1913
The Boat of My Lover (D. M. M. Craik), Oliver Ditson, 1913
Green Branches (Fiona MacLeod), Oliver Ditson, 1913
Hushing Song (Fiona MacLeod), Oliver Ditson, 1913
Only Once, Love (R. W. Gilder), Oliver Ditson, 1913
Wood Song (Eugene Lee-Hamilton), Oliver Ditson, 1913, T.I.S. Reprint, 1998
When I Wake (Anonymous), Oliver Ditson, 1916, T.I.S. Reprint, 1998
Two Songs, G. Schirmer, 1918
Like Music on the Waters (Lord Byron)
Barcarole (Pai Ta-shun)

Love Me (Sara Teasdale), unknown publisher, 1919
Pierrot (Sara Teasdale), unknown publisher, 1919
The Poet Sings (Richard LeGallienne), Oliver Ditson, 1919 (dedicated to John McCormack)
When Beauty Grows (unknown author), unknown publisher, c. 1919
Vignettes of Italy (Sara Teasdale), Oliver Ditson, 1919
Addio
Naples
Capri (Isle of Beauty)
Night song at Amalfi
Ruins of Paestum
From a Roman Hill
Ponte Vecchio, Florence
Villa Serbelloni, Bellaggio
Stresa

Five Songs, G. Schirmer, 1919
Beloved, it is Morn (E. H. Hickey)
The Mother’s Song (C. R. Robertson)
Golden Rose (Grace Hazard Conkling)
Utopia (Frances Turner Palgrave)
Magic (Harriet Morgan)

Falmouth Town (Dramatic Ballad for Baritone) (William Ernest Henley), G. Schirmer, 1921
Tryste Noël (Louise Imogen Guiney), unknown publisher, 1921
Wings of Night (Sara Teasdale), G. Schirmer, 1921
Joy (Sara Teasdale), G. Schirmer, 1922 (dedicated to John McCormack)
Three Lyric Poems, G. Schirmer, 1922
With the tide (Edward J. O'Brien)
Transformation (Jessie B. Rittenhouse)
The nightingale and the rose (William Ernest Henley)

A Little Page’s Song (13th century, William Alexander Percy’s Reliques), Ricordi, 1922
The Little Shepherd’s Song (13th century, William Alexander Percy's Reliques), Franco Colombo, Ricordi, 1922
Bring Her Again to Me (Williams Ernest Henley), G. Schirmer, 1923
Intreat Me not to Leave Thee (Sacred, Book of Ruth), G. Schirmer, 1923
Two Songs by Sara Teasdale, G. Schirmer, 1923
Only A Cry (Sara Teasdale)
Let it be Forgotten (Sara Teasdale)

Only and Forever (William Ernest Henley), G. Schirmer, 1923
A White Rose (John Boyle O’Reilly), G. Schimer, 1923
Wild Tears (Louise Imogen Guiney), G. Schirmer, 1923
Three Songs for low voice, G. Schirmer, 1924
Song is so old (H. Hagedorn)
Miniver Cheevy (Edward Arlington Robinson)
Dark Hills  (Edward Arlington Robinson)

Circles, song cycle (texts by Watts?), 1932, arr. string quartet, 1936
Exile (Unknown Author), Galaxy Music, 1936
That Little Word No (Unknown Author), Galaxy Music, 1938
Birdeen (Fiona MacLeod), unpublished, 1948
In Silhouette (words and music by Watts), unknown publisher and date

Larger musical works
Incidental music for The Double Life (M. R. Rinehart), 1906
Young Blood, symphony/tone-pageant, 1919
Alice in Wonderland, opera (R. B. Butler, after Lewis Carroll), 1920
Two Etchings for Orchestra, 1922
Bridal Overture
Pied Piper, opera
The Piper, symphonic poem, 1927

Footnotes

References

External links
http://www.lieder.net/lieder/w/watts.html Texts of some songs by Wintter Watts

1884 births
1962 deaths
20th-century classical composers
American male classical composers
American classical composers
Musicians from Cincinnati
20th-century American composers
Classical musicians from Ohio
20th-century American male musicians